Jean de Montfort (died December 1300) was count of Squillace, seigneur of la Ferté-Alais, of Bréthencourt, and of Castres-en-Albigeois from 1270 to 1300.  He was the son of Philippe II de Montfort, count of Squillace, Lord of La Ferté Alais, of Bréthencourt and of Castres, and of Jeanne de Lévis-Mirepoix.

He succeeded his father on his death in 1270 in Tunis in the course of the Eighth Crusade.  He went to the kingdom of Naples where he was named captain-general of Calabria, in 1299. He died the following year, having had no issue despite marrying three times:
 Isabella Maletta, daughter of Manfred Maletta,
 Giovanna di Fasanella, dame de Genzano, daughter of Pandolfo di Fasanella,
Marguerite de Beaumont-en-Gâtinais, daughter of Pierre de Beaumont, count of Montescaglioso et d'Alba, and of Filippa de Ceccano.  On Jean's death she remarried to Robert II of Dreux, seigneur of Beu.

Ancestry

Sources 
  

Counts of France
1300 deaths
Jean
Year of birth unknown
Counts of Squillace